The 2019 China Championship (officially the 2019 Evergrande China Championship) was a professional snooker tournament that took place from 23 to 29 September 2019. The event was held at the Guangzhou Tianhe Sports Centre in Guangzhou, China. Qualifying for the event took place from 15 to 18 August 2019 at the Barnsley Metrodome in Barnsley, England. The tournament was the fourth edition of the China Championship and the third ranking event of the 2019/2020 season.

Mark Selby was the defending champion, having defeated John Higgins in the previous year's final 10–9. Selby reached the semi-finals, before losing 6–3 to Shaun Murphy. Murphy reached his third consecutive final, having done so at the two prior events Shanghai Masters and the International Championship. Murphy played Mark Williams in the final, winning his 8th ranking title with a 10–9 in the final. The highest  of the event was a 145 made by Mark Allen in the first round win over Anthony Hamilton.

Tournament format 
The 2019 China Championship was the fourth edition of the China Championship, first held in 2016. The event featured 64 players with a wildcard and qualifying round. Matches were played as best-of-9- until the semi-finals. At the semi-final stage, both matches were played as best-of-11-frames, and the two session final as best-of-19-frames.

Prize fund 
The event featured a total prize fund of £751,000, with the winner receiving £150,000. This was slightly higher than the 2018 prize fund of £725,000 with the same denomination for the winner. A breakdown of prize money at the event is shown below:
 Winner: £150,000
 Runner-up: £75,000
 Semi-final: £32,000
 Quarter-final: £20,000
 Last 16: £13,000
 Last 32: £7,500
 Last 64: £4,750
 Highest break: £6,000 
 Total: £751,000

Tournament summary 
Qualifying for the event was played over one round, and a pre-qualifier wildcard round. Qualifying took place between 15 and 18 August 2019 at the Barnsley Metrodome in Barnsley, England featuring 64 matches. Participants included players on the World Snooker Tour and invited amateur players.

Early rounds (first–fourth round) 

Defending champion Mark Selby won his opening first round match, defeating Chen Feilong. Selby trailed 1–2, before Selby won three of the next four to win the match 5–3. Selby defeated Martin Gould, and then Chris Wakelin both 5–2 to reach the quarter-finals. Three-time world champion Mark Williams defeated Kishan Hirani in an all Welsh opening round match 5–1. Williams defeated Luo Honghao and Luca Brecel to reach the quarter-finals. Maflin then defeated Jordan Brown to play four-time world champion John Higgins. Four-time world champion Higgins led their match 3–0, before Maflin won five frames in-a-row to win the match, and reach the quarter-finals.

Having amassed a 15-match winning streak, Judd Trump lost in the third round to Joe Perry 5–2. Trump had not lost a match since April, and won the prior two tournaments that he played in, the World Snooker Championship and the International Championship. The 2005 world champion Shaun Murphy also reached the quarter-finals. He defeated Yuan Sijun, Ryan Day, and Matthew Selt all 5–3. Barry Hawkins defeated Liam Highfield, Mitchell Mann and Zhao Xintong to reach the last-8. Iranian Hossein Vafaei defeated Tom Ford, Kyren Wilson and Anthony McGill to reach the quarter-finals.

Former world number one Ding Junhui also lost his opening match where he lost 5–3 to Zhao Xintong. Mark Allen won his opening match against Anthony Hamilton 5–3, also making the highest break of the tournament, a 145. Allen subsequently lost in the second round to Noppon Saengkham 5–4. Saengkham lost the third round to David Gilbert.

Later rounds (quarter-final–final) 
The quarter-finals were played on 27 September. Defending champion Selby played Hawkins in the first quarter-final. The pair were always within one frame between scores, and were tied at 4–4. Selby made match's highest break of 98 in the deciding frame to claim a 5–4 victory. Shaun Murphy drew Kurt Maflin, Murphy lead the match throughout and won 5–2. Having defeated the reigning world champion in the round prior, Joe Perry was defeated by Hossein Vafaei. In winning the match, Vafaei reached only his third ranking semi-final. In the last quarter-final match, Mark Williams defeated David Gilbert 5–1.

The semi-finals were played on 28 September, as best-of-11-frames matches. The first match had Murphy defeat Selby. Murphy won the first three frames of the match, before Selby won three of the next four with breaks of 100, and 101. Murphy won the next two frames to win the match 6–3. The second semi-final was contested between Vafaei and Williams. Vafaei had never played in a ranking event final, but reached this stage at the 2017 China Open, and the 2019 Welsh Open. Williams had lost only six frames in the prior five matches. Williams won the first three frames, and four of the first five to lead 4–1, before Vafaei made a 134 break to trail 4–2. Williams won frame seven, to be one away from victory, but Vafaei won three frames in-a-row to take the match to a deciding frame. He later commented, "[he] could play that another 20 times and [he] wouldn't get it".

The final was played on 29 September, a best-of-19-frames match played over two . The final was contested between Shaun Murphy (who had defeated Yuan Sijun, Ryan Day, Matthew Selt, Kurt Maflin and Mark Selby to reach the final), and Mark Williams (who defeated Kishan Hirani, Luo Honghao, Luca Brecel, David Gilbert, and Hossein Vafaei). This was Williams' 35th ranking event final, event final and Murphy's 20th. Murphy had reached the final of both of the prior two tournaments, the International Championship and the Shanghai Masters, but had not won any of his prior five tournament finals. Williams, in comparison, had won all of his last five finals.

The first session ended 5–4 in favour of Murphy, with Williams tying the match in frame 10. Murphy made breaks of  75, 76, 103 and 79 in four consecutive frames to lead 9–5. With his opponent one frame from winning the event, Williams won the next four frames, including a break of 132 in frame 18 to force a deciding frame. Williams made a break of 30, and attempted to play a snooker. However, Murphy potted the last remaining  to win the frame and match. After his win, he would comment that the break in the deciding frame was "one of the best breaks of [his] life". Murphy's last victory was over 18 months prior, and had struggled during the 2018/19 season, which he called the "worst run" of his career.

Main draw 
The main draw of the event featured 64 players. Players in bold denote match winners.

Top half

Bottom half

Final

Qualifying 
Qualifying for the event took place between 15 and 18 August 2019 at the Barnsley Metrodome in Barnsley, England. Matches involving four wildcard players, Mark Selby and Chen Feilong, Yan Bingtao and Mei Xiwen, Ding Junhui and Brandon Sargeant, Ken Doherty, Tom Ford, Judd Trump and James Wattana, were held over and played in Guangzhou. Matches were played as best-of-9-frames. Players in bold denote match winners.

Round 1

Round 2

Century breaks

Main stage centuries 
There were a total of 58 century breaks made during the tournament. Mark Allen made the highest break of the event, a 145. The break was made in frame five of the first round win over Anthony Hamilton. Three centuries were made in held over matches, two by Mark Selby and one by Judd Trump.

 145, 117  Mark Allen
 143, 132  Mark Williams
 140  Noppon Saengkham
 139, 103  Barry Hawkins
 138  Mark King
 137, 121, 121, 108, 101, 100  Mark Selby
 137, 134, 123, 104  Hossein Vafaei
 137  Scott Donaldson
 135, 116, 101  Kyren Wilson
 134, 101  Joe Perry
 133, 129, 103, 100  Shaun Murphy
 133  Marco Fu
 131, 124  Stephen Maguire
 130, 120, 113  Luo Honghao
 127  Yuan Sijun
 126, 126  David Gilbert
 126, 101  Yan Bingtao
 122, 121, 109, 102  Judd Trump
 120, 116, 109  Chris Wakelin
 119  Ryan Day
 117  Joe O'Connor
 108  Li Hang
 106  John Higgins
 105, 103  Ricky Walden
 104, 103  Kurt Maflin
 104  Luca Brecel
 104  Tian Pengfei
 104  Xiao Guodong
 101  Anthony Hamilton

Qualifying stage centuries 
There were a total of 28 century breaks made during the qualifying matches preceding the event.

 143  Zhao Xintong
 141, 101  Shaun Murphy
 138  Sam Baird
 134  Chris Wakelin
 132  Michael Georgiou
 132  Stephen Maguire
 131  David Gilbert
 123  Jak Jones
 122  Zhou Yuelong
 120  Mark Joyce
 120  Sunny Akani
 118  Anthony Hamilton
 112  Ashley Carty
 112  Barry Hawkins
 110  Mark Williams
 108  Kyren Wilson
 107  Ryan Day
 107  Marco Fu
 106  John Higgins
 105  Noppon Saengkham
 104  Chen Zifan
 104  Andy Hicks
 102  Lyu Haotian
 102  Robert Milkins
 101  Luca Brecel
 100  Liam Highfield
 100  Hammad Miah

References 

China Championship (snooker)
China Championship
China Championship
China Championship